John Newcombe and Tony Roche were the defending champions, but Roche did not compete. Newcombe partnered with Ken Fletcher, and they defeated Bill Bowrey and Owen Davidson in the final, 6–3, 6–4, 3–6, 6–3 to win the gentlemen's doubles tennis title at the 1966 Wimbledon Championship.

Seeds

  Roy Emerson /  Fred Stolle (third round, withdrew)
 n/a
  Clark Graebner /  Marty Riessen (semifinals)
  Bill Bowrey /  Owen Davidson (final)

Draw

Finals

Top half

Section 1

Section 2

Bottom half

Section 3

Section 4

References

External links

Men's Doubles
Wimbledon Championship by year – Men's doubles